Elizabeth of Pomerania (– 15 April 1393) was the fourth and final wife of Charles IV, Holy Roman Emperor and King of Bohemia.

Life
Elizabeth was the daughter of Bogislaw V, Duke of Pomerania and Elisabeth of Poland. Her maternal grandparents were Casimir III, King of Poland, and Aldona of Lithuania. Elizabeth married Charles was held on 25 May 1363 in Kraków, only one year after the death of Charles's third wife, Anne of Schweidnitz. The bride was 16 years old, while the groom was 47. Charles married Elisabeth mainly for diplomatic reason, as the marriage helped to break the anti-Czech coalition led by Rudolf IV, Duke of Austria, with Polish and Hungarian kings as participants. On 18 June 1363 in the Bohemian capital Prague, Elisabeth was crowned Queen of Bohemia, and 5 years later, on 1 November 1368, she was also crowned empress of the Holy Roman Empire in Rome by Pope Urban V.

Elizabeth and Charles had:
Anne of Bohemia (1366–1394), married Richard II of England
Sigismund (1368–1437), the Holy Roman Emperor and King of Bohemia and Hungary
John of Görlitz (1370–1396), margrave of Moravia and duke of Görlitz, who married Richardis Catherine of Sweden
Charles (13 March 1372 – 24 July 1373)
Margaret of Bohemia (1373–1410), who was married to John III, Burgrave of Nuremberg
Henry (1377–1378)

Queen and empress
Elizabeth is reputed to have been a very vigorous, self-confident and physically strong person. The relationship between Elizabeth and Charles is described to have been good and harmonious. During the serious illness of Charles in 1371, Elisabeth made a miniature pilgrimage by walking on foot to the cathedral and offering gifts in a prayer to his health. Their good relationship has been portrayed in art, such as in Noc na Karlštejně (A Night at Karlstein). She does not seem to have wielded any political influence, however: she was tormented by the fact that Charles preferred his children from his former marriage, but was unable to change his mind.

Widowhood
After her husband's death at 29 November 1378 in Prague, Elizabeth's stepson Wenceslaus IV, son of Charles's previous wife, ascended the throne. Elisabeth then cared for her own two sons, mainly the older Sigismund, whom she supported in his efforts to become the king of Hungary.

Elizabeth outlived Charles IV by 15 years. She died on 15 February 1393 in Hradec Králové (Königgrätz) and was buried next to her husband in St. Vitus Cathedral.

References

Sources

Further reading
 J. Fidler, České královny [Queens of Bohemia] (Havlíčkův Brod, 2004)
 KAVKA, František. Čtyři ženy Karla IV. Královské sňatky. Praha ; Litomyšl : Paseka, 2002. 189 s. .
 SPĚVÁČEK, Jiří. Karel IV. Život a dílo (1316–1378). Praha : Nakladatelství Svoboda, 1980. 721 s.
 SPĚVÁČEK, Jiří. Václav IV. 1361–1419. K předpokladům husitské revoluce. Praha : Nakladatelství Svoboda, 1986. 773 s.

|-

|-

|-

1347 births
1393 deaths
14th-century Polish nobility
Holy Roman Empresses
Italian queens consort
Wives of Charles IV, Holy Roman Emperor
14th-century Polish people
14th-century Polish women
14th-century women of the Holy Roman Empire
14th-century German women
Burials at St. Vitus Cathedral